Cryoturris lavalleana is a species of sea snail, a marine gastropod mollusk in the family Mangeliidae.

Description
The length of the shell can be as much as 7 mm (.276 inches).

Distribution
Cryoturris lavalleana is native to the Caribbean Sea off Colombia, Cuba, Jamaica and Puerto Rico

References

External links
  Tucker, J.K. 2004 Catalog of recent and fossil turrids (Mollusca: Gastropoda). Zootaxa 682: 1–1295.

lavalleana